Kent Street station is a light rail surface stop on the MBTA Green Line C branch, located in the median of Beacon Street in Brookline, Massachusetts. The two side platforms are staggered on opposite sides of the Kent Street / Powell Street grade crossing; the outbound platform is to the east and the inbound platform to the west. Kent Street is not accessible.

Track work in 2018–19, which included replacement of platform edges at several stops, triggered requirements for accessibility modifications at those stops. By December 2022, design for Kent Street and seven other C Branch stations was 15% complete, with construction expected to take place in 2024.

References

External links

MBTA - Kent Street
 Station from Google Maps Street View

Green Line (MBTA) stations
Railway stations in Brookline, Massachusetts